In Hinduism, Valuka Iswar is an Avatar or form of Lord Shiva, which literally means an idol made of sand, Sanskrit:valuka= Sand, Ishwara= Lord,.

Famous Valuka Iswar shrines
The ancient Walkeshwar Temple in the Indian city of Mumbai was built under the supervision of minister Lakshman Prabhu of the Silhara dynasty to commemorate and worship Valuka Iswar.

References

Forms of Shiva
Hindu studies
History of Mumbai